330th may refer to:

330th Aircraft Sustainment Group, inactive group of the United States Air Force 
330th Aircraft Sustainment Wing, former wing of the United States Air Force 
330th Bombardment Group (VH), former bomber group of the United States Army Air Forces active during World War II
330th Combat Training Squadron, unit of the United States Air Force
330th Fighter-Interceptor Squadron, former unit of the United States Air Force 
330th Rifle Division (Soviet Union), former infantry division of the Red Army founded during World War II

See also
330 (number)
330, the year 330 (CCCXXX) of the Julian calendar